SM U-11 was one of the 329 submarines serving in the Imperial German Navy in World War I.

U-11 was engaged in the naval warfare and took part in the First Battle of the Atlantic.

References

Notes

Citations

Bibliography

External links

World War I submarines of Germany
Type U 9 submarines
1910 ships
Ships built in Danzig
U-boats commissioned in 1910
Maritime incidents in December 1914
U-boats sunk in 1914
U-boats sunk by mines
World War I shipwrecks in the English Channel